Water Police is a reality-style action drama series with real police officers and emergency service assets in addition to professional actors. Production required a unique Deed of Agreement—the first ever of its type in Queensland, Australia—between the production company and the State of Queensland, and signed by the Police Commissioner and the production's Executive Producer. Water Police (aka the Wateries) was also the first action drama series specifically produced for TiVo delivery in Australia and New Zealand in 2009. A new series is currently in production, under the new title of Police Force, with each new season featuring a different specialist police operation.

References

English-language television shows